Rocky Hill is a town in Hartford County, Connecticut, United States.  The population was 20,845 at the 2020 census. It was originally land of the Wangunks (a tribe of Native Americans). Europeans began to settle the area of Rocky Hill in 1650, as part of Wethersfield, the neighboring town to the north. In 1722, the area became known as Stepney Parish, until it was independently incorporated in 1843. Rocky Hill’s location on the Connecticut River made it a natural port for Wethersfield and an early center for shipbuilding, agricultural, and trade.

Rocky Hill is a typical bedroom community as many residents commute to work in the larger urban centers of Hartford to the north and New Haven to the south.

Rocky Hill is the home to the Dinosaur State Park.  Rocky Hill also was once the headquarters of Ames Department Stores, which ceased business operations in 2002.

Geography

Bordering Rocky Hill to the north is Wethersfield, with Newington to the northwest, Berlin to the southwest, and Cromwell to the south. The Connecticut River forms the eastern border. Interstate 91 runs through the town with exits at the two main local highways, Route 3 at exit 23 and Route 99 at exit 24.  Route 3 travels from Cromwell through Rocky Hill into Wethersfield, eventually crossing the Connecticut River into Glastonbury.  The north-south Route 99 parallels the Connecticut River for the length of town.

The town of Rocky Hill is named after the ridge along the Connecticut River in the northeast section that is now Rocky Hill River Park.

Demographics

As of the 2000 Census, Rocky Hill had a population of 17,966 in 7,557 households, with 4,519 families residing in the town. The racial makeup of the town was 90.20% White, 3.42% African American, 0.11% Native American, 3.97% Asian, 0.03% Pacific Islander, 1.01% from other races, and 1.27% from two or more races. Hispanic or Latino people of any race were 3.20% of the population.

There were 7,557 households, out of which 24.9% had children under the age of 18 living with them, 48.9% were married couples living together, 7.9% had a female householder with no husband present, and 40.2% were non-families. Of all households 32.5% were made up of individuals, and 9.7% had someone living alone who was 65 years of age or older.  The average household size was 2.26 and the average family size was 2.93.

In terms of age, 19.7% of the population were under the age of 18, 6.1% were between 18 and 24, 31.9% were 25 to 44, 25.8% were 45 to 64, and 16.5% were 65 or older.  The median age was 41 years. For every 100 females, there were 97.6 males.  For every 100 females age 18 and over, there were 95.7 males.

The median household income in the town was $60,247, and the median income for a family was $72,726. Males had a median income of $48,555 versus $39,625 for females. The per capita income for the town was $29,701.  About 1.2% of families and 2.9% of the population were below the poverty line, including 1.8% of those under age 18 and 3.0% of those age 65 or over.

Education
Rocky Hill Public Schools is the local school district.

Rocky Hill High School has a student body of approximately 800 students. Albert D. Griswold Middle School enrolls about 600 students. Moser Intermediate School enrolls about 500 students. Stevens Elementary School enrolls about 500 students. West Hill Elementary School enrolls around 525 students.

Points of interest
 The Rocky Hill-Glastonbury Ferry to Glastonbury, which is purported to be the nation's oldest continuously running ferry service (though it closes every winter due to ice)
 Dinosaur State Park, which displays fossilized dinosaur footprints discovered in Rocky Hill in the 1960s
 Quarry Park, an  park on a former trap rock quarry in northeast Rocky Hill that originally was in operation from the 1920s to the 1950s
 The Connecticut Library for the Blind and Physically Handicapped
 The State Veteran's Home and Hospital, located in Rocky Hill since 1940
 Academy Hall, a museum run by the Rocky Hill Historical Society
 The John Robbins House
 Elm Street Historic District
 Center Cemetery
 Henkel Corporation's U.S. Headquarters for Adhesive Technologies and R&D 
 The headquarters of the Connecticut Lottery
 The studios of CBS-affiliated television station WFSB Channel 3

References

External links

Town of Rocky Hill official website
Rocky Hill Historical Society

 
Greater Hartford
Connecticut populated places on the Connecticut River
Towns in Connecticut
Towns in Hartford County, Connecticut